Margot Susanna Adler (April 16, 1946 – July 28, 2014) was an American author, journalist, lecturer, Wiccan priestess, and New York correspondent for National Public Radio (NPR).

Early life 
Born in Little Rock, Arkansas, Adler grew up mostly in New York City. She attended The High School of Music & Art (later joined with The High School of Performing Arts to become The LaGuardia High School of Music & Art and the Performing Arts) in New York City. Her grandfather, Alfred Adler, was a noted Austrian Jewish psychotherapist, collaborator with Sigmund Freud and the founder of the school of individual psychology.

Education 
Adler received a bachelor of arts in political science from the University of California, Berkeley and a master's degree from the Columbia University Graduate School of Journalism in New York in 1970. She was a Nieman Fellow at Harvard University in 1982.

Journalism and radio 

During the mid-1960s, Adler worked as a volunteer reporter for KPFA-FM, the Pacifica Radio station in Berkeley, California. After returning to New York City, she worked at its sister station, WBAI-FM, where, in 1972, she created the talk show Hour of the Wolf (still on the air as hosted by Jim Freund), and later another talk show, called Unstuck in Time.

Adler joined NPR in 1979 as a general assignment reporter, after spending a year as an NPR freelance reporter covering New York City, and subsequently worked on a great many pieces dealing with subjects as diverse as the death penalty, the right to die movement, the response to the war in Kosovo, computer gaming, the drug ecstasy, geek culture, children and technology and Pokémon. After 9/11, she focused much of her work on stories exploring the human factors in New York City, from the loss of loved ones, homes and jobs, to work in the relief effort.  She was the host of Justice Talking up until the show ceased production on July 3, 2008. She was a regular voice on Morning Edition and All Things Considered. She was also co-producer of an award-winning radio drama, War Day.

Neopaganism 
Adler wrote Drawing Down the Moon, a 1979 book about Neopaganism which was revised in 2006. The book is considered by some a watershed in American Neopagan circles, as it provided the first comprehensive look at modern nature-based religions in the US. For many years it was the only introductory work about American Neopagan communities.

Her second book, Heretic's Heart: A Journey Through Spirit and Revolution, was published by Beacon Press in 1997. Adler was a Wiccan priestess, an elder in the Covenant of the Goddess, and she also participated in the Unitarian Universalist faith community.

Death 
In early 2011, Adler was diagnosed with endometrial cancer, which metastasized over the following three years. Adler died on July 28, 2014 at the age of 68. She remained virtually symptom-free until mid-2014. Adler was cared for in her final months by her son.

Bibliography 

 1979 – Drawing Down the Moon: Witches, Druids, Goddess-Worshippers, and Other Pagans in America Today 
 1997 – Heretic's Heart: A Journey Through Spirit and Revolution (Beacon Press) 
 2000 – Our Way to the Stars by Margot Adler & John Gliedman  – Motorbooks Intl , 
 2013 – Out for Blood Kindle Single
 2014 – Vampires Are Us (Weiser Books) ,

Contributed to 
 1989 – Healing the Wounds: The Promise of Ecofeminism – Judith Plant (editor) (New Society Pub) 
 1994 – Return of the Great Goddess by Burleigh Muten (Shambhala) 
 1995 – People of the Earth: The New Pagans Speak Out by Ellen Evert Hopman, Lawrence Bond (Inner Traditions) 
 2001 – Modern Pagans: an Investigation of Contemporary Ritual (Re/Search) 
 2002 – The Free Speech Movement: Reflections on Berkeley in the 1960s – Edited by Robert Cohen and Reginald E. Zelnik (University of California Press) 
 2003 – Sisterhood Is Forever: The Women's Anthology for a New Millennium (Adler wrote "Inner Space: The Spiritual Frontier") – edited by Robin Morgan (Washington Square Press) 
 2005 – Cakes and Ale for the Pagan Soul: Spells, Recipes, and Reflections from Neopagan Elders and Teachers – Patricia Telesco (Celestial Arts)

Discography 
 1986 – From Witch to Witch-Doctor: Healers, Therapists and Shamans ACE – Lecture on cassette
 1986 – The Magickal Movement: Present and Future (with Isaac Bonewits, Selena Fox, and Robert Anton Wilson) ACE – Panel discussion on cassette

See also

Maggie Shayne
Murry Hope

Notes

References 
 Vale, V. and John Sulak (2001). Modern Pagans. San Francisco: Re/Search Publications.

External links

 

1946 births
2014 deaths
20th-century occultists
20th-century American women writers
21st-century occultists
Margot
American occultists
American people of Austrian-Jewish descent
American people of Hungarian-Jewish descent
American radio journalists
American spiritual writers
American Wiccans
Deaths from cancer in New York (state)
Deaths from endometrial cancer
Columbia University Graduate School of Journalism alumni
The High School of Music & Art alumni
Jewish American journalists
Jewish American writers
Jewish women writers
Nieman Fellows
NPR personalities
Pacifica Foundation people
Pagan studies scholars
UC Berkeley College of Letters and Science alumni
Wiccan priestesses
Wiccan writers
Women religious writers
Writers from New York City
Converts from Judaism
20th-century American journalists
21st-century American journalists
American women radio journalists
Wiccans of Jewish descent
21st-century American women writers
21st-century American Jews